Rodney Kohler "Rod" Johnston (September 2, 1937March 30, 2018) was an American attorney and Republican politician.  He served six years in the Wisconsin State Senate (1979–1985) after four years in the State Assembly (1975–1979), representing suburban North Shore area of Milwaukee County.  In 1982, he was the Republican nominee for United States Congress in Wisconsin's 5th congressional district, but was defeated by Jim Moody.

In 1984, Johnston was challenged by Democrat Barbara Ulichny in the 4th Senate district.  Ulichny prevailed in the general election, taking 55% of the vote.

Biography
Johnston was born in Milwaukee, Wisconsin.  He was educated at Wauwatosa East High School, graduating in 1955.  Johnston placed first in the Naval Academy competitive examination from his Wisconsin congressional district in 1955, and was appointed to the United States Naval Academy, graduating in 1959.  He then served six years in the United States Navy.

After leaving the service, he enrolled at George Washington University Law School, where he received his J.D. in 1967.

Johnston began his political in career 1968 by finishing second (with 34.58% of the vote) to the eventual winner of the seat, Jim Sensenbrenner, in the Republican primary race for a seat in the Wisconsin Assembly.

Johnston died March 30, 2018, at his home on Tybee Island, Georgia, at the age of 80. He was survived by his three children, Scott, Julie and actress Kristen Johnston.

References

1937 births
2018 deaths
Politicians from Milwaukee
Republican Party Wisconsin state senators
Republican Party members of the Wisconsin State Assembly
Wisconsin lawyers
Military personnel from Milwaukee
United States Navy officers
United States Naval Academy alumni
20th-century American politicians
Candidates in the 1982 United States elections
20th-century American lawyers
People from Chatham County, Georgia